Upendra Jethalal Trivedi (14 July 1936 4 January 2015) was an Indian film and stage actor, director and producer who was one of the most prolific actors of Gujarati cinema. As an actor films like Mehndi Rang Lagyo (1960), Jogidas Khuman (1962) were few of his earliest appearances in Gujarati films. He was also politically active. He was also known as Abhinay Samrat.

Early life
Upendra Trivedi was born on 14 July 1936 in Indore, Madhya Pradesh, India. His family hailed from Kukadia village near Idar, Gujarat. His parents moved to Ujjain where he completed his education. He lived with his elder brother in Mumbai in early life. He worked as a coolie and a labourer in umbrella manufacturing factory when his father who was a mill worker suffered paralysis.

Trivedi was one of the four siblings – three brothers and a sister. He did his graduation from the Bombay University in Arts faculty. His younger brother, Arvind Trivedi, is also well-known actor who played Ravana in the Hindi epic TV serial, Ramayana. Trivedi's elder brother, Bhalchandra, was an educationist.

Career
Considered one of the most well-known actors of the Gujarati film industry, Trivedi had acted in both Gujarati theatre and films.

Acting career

Upendra Trivedi acted in several drama during his college life in Mumbai. He started his career in industry in the 1970s and had career spanning more than 40 years. He initially played supporting roles in several Gujarati films to earn money and pay college fees. He acted in films like  Vanraj Chavdo and Mehndi Rang Lagyo.

His first major break in Gujarati films was Jesal Toral (1971) directed by Ravindra Dave. Ravindra Dave chose him to play lead role following his performance in Gujarati film Abhinay Samrat. Jesal Toral was commercially successful film in which he played role of Jadeja.

He also directed several Gujarati films. His Manvini Bhavai (1993), based on the novel of the same name by Gujarati author, Pannalal Patel. The movie earned the national award. The story of movie was based on the famine of Vikram Samvat 1956 (1900 AD) where the condition of people was dire and many died due to starvation. He also directed and produced Jher To Peedhan Jani Jani based on the novel of same name by Manubhai Pancholi.

He paired with Naresh Kanodia for the first time in film Maa Baap ne Bhulsho Nahi in 1999. He paired with Snehlata in several Gujarati films.

He played seven different roles in Gujarati play, Abhinay Samrat.

His brother Arvind Trivedi is also an actor who acted in Gujarati and Hindi films as well as television shows. He also acted in Hindi film Jungle Main Mangal, Pavitra Papi, Parde ke Pichhe, Nagina along with his brother Arvind Trivedi in a negative role.

Political career
Upendra Trivedi joined politics in 1980s and contested and won the election in 1985 and 1990 with INC ticket and 1998 as an independent candidate to Gujarat Legislative Assembly from Bhiloda. He served as the deputy speaker of the assembly from 31 March 2000 to 19 July 2002.

He wrote an autobiography, Upendra Trivedi : Atmakathan ane Anya Aalekh.

Death
Trivedi died on 4 January 2015 at Mumbai following respiratory arrest. He was married and had two sons.

Awards
He received the Padma Shri in 1989 and Pandit Omkarnath Thakur award also.

Filmography

As actor
Film he acted include:

 Kadu Makrani (1960)
 Mehndi Rang Lagyo (1960)
 Hiro Salaat (1961)
 Veer Ramwalo (1961)
 Jogidas Khuman (1962)
 Vanraj Chavdo (1963)
 Jesal Toral (1971)
 Parde Ke Peeche (1971, Hindi)
 Jher To Pidhan Jaani Jaani (1972)
 Jungle Main Mangal (1972, Hindi)
 Kadu Makrani (1973)
 Raja Bharathari (1973)
 Ranakdevi (1973)
 Mahasati Savitri (1973)
 Blackmail (1973)
 Ghunghat (1974)
 Harishchandra Taramati (1974)
 Hothal Padmani (1974)
 Jogidas Khuman (1975)
 Jai Ranchhod (1975)
 Bhadar Tara Vehta Pani (1975)
 Shetalne Kanthe (1975)
 Chundadino Rang (1976)
 Malavpati Munj (1976)
 Ra'Navghan (1976)
 Santu Rangili (1976)
 Veer Mangadavalo (1976)
 Bhrashtachar Murdabad (1977)
 Halaman Jethvo (1977)
 Manno Manigar (1977)
 Paiso Bole Chhe (1977)
 Sadavant Savlinga (1977)
 Sonkansari (1977)
 Kali Rat (1977)
 Khel Khiladi Ka (1977, Hindi)
 Chundadi Odhi Tara Naam Ni (1978)
 Dada Khetrapal (1978)
 Manek Thumbh (1978)
 Patri Parmar (1978)
 Ver Ni Vasulat (1978)
 Amarsinh Rathod (1979)
 Garvo Garasiyo (1979)
 Kunwari Satino Kesari Kanth (1979)
 Lalwadi Phoolwadi (1979)
 Navrang Chundadi (1979)
 Preet Khandani Dhar (1979)
 Rang Rasiya (1979)
 Sona Indhoni Rupa Bedlun (1979)
 Suraj Chandrani Sakhe (1979)
 Vahue Vagovya Mota Khorda (1979)
 Veer Pasali (1979)
 Chitadano Chor (1980)
 Jivi Rabaran (1980)
 Kesar Kathiyani (1980)
 Koino Ladakvayo (1980)
 Namni Nagarvel (1980)
 Sorathni Padmini (1980)
 Amar Devidas (1981)
 Bhav Bhavna Bheru (1981)
 Mehulo Luhar (1981)
 Sheth Jagadusha (1981)
 Vansali Vagi Valamni (1981)
 Retina Ratan (1982)
 Vachhada Dadani Dikri (1983)
 Dharatina Ami (1984)
 Mali Methan (1984)
 Manasaina Diva (1984)
 Machchhu Tara Vaheta Pani (1984)
 Nagmati Nagvalo (1984)
 Sajan Sonalde (1984)
 Malo Naagde (1985)
 Sole Somwar (1988)
 Bhadarne Kanthe (1991)
 Manvini Bhavai (1993)
 Maa Baap ne Bhulsho Nahi (1999)

As director
 Manvini Bhavai (1993, based on the novel of the same name)
 Jher To Peedha Chhe Jani Jani (1972)

References

External links
 

1936 births
2015 deaths
Indian male film actors
Place of birth missing
Indian actor-politicians
Male actors in Gujarati-language films
Deputy Speakers of the Gujarat Legislative Assembly
Recipients of the Padma Shri in arts
Gujarat MLAs 1998–2002
Indian National Congress politicians
Bharatiya Janata Party politicians from Gujarat
Gujarat MLAs 1985–1990
Gujarat MLAs 1990–1995